Biff is a given name, a nickname or part of a stage name.

People

Nickname
 Biff Byford (born 1951), British lead singer of the heavy metal band Saxon
 Frank Dunlap (1924–1993), Canadian Football League player
 James T. Ellison (c. 1861–?), New York City gangster
 William Grimes (journalist) (born 1950), former magazine writer, culture reporter, theater columnist, restaurant critic, book reviewer and a current obituary writer for The New York Times
 Biff Henderson (born 1946), American stage manager and television personality on the Late Show with David Letterman
 Biff Jones (1895–1980), former college football head coach and member of the College Football Hall of Fame
 Biff Liff (1919–2015), born Samuel Liff, Tony Award-winning American Broadway manager and producer.
 Biff McGuire (1926–2021), American stage and film actor
 Biff Rose (born 1937), American comedian and singer-songwriter
 Biff Schaller (1889–1939), Major League Baseball player
 Biff Schlitzer (1884–1948), Major League Baseball pitcher
 Biff Sheehan (1868–1923), Major League Baseball player
 Richard Stannard (songwriter), British songwriter
 Claude Taugher (1897–1963), National Football League player and decorated World War I US Marine Corps officer
 Biff Wysong (1905–1951), Major League Baseball pitcher

Given name
 Biff Mitchell (born 1947), Canadian novelist, satirist and humorist
 Biff Pocoroba (1953–2020), American baseball player
 Biff Yeager, American actor

Stage name
 Biff Debrie, stage name of Don Preston (born 1932), American jazz and rock and roll musician
 Biff Elliot (1923–2012), American actor

Fictional characters
 Biff Baker, Cold War spy in the American TV series Biff Baker, U.S.A., played by Alan Hale, Jr.
 Biff Brannon, a character in Carson McCullers's novel The Heart Is a Lonely Hunter
 Biff Brewster, teenage hero of 13 adventure and mystery novels in the 1960s
 Biff Fowler, in the ITV soap Emmerdale
 Biff Grimes, in The Strawberry Blonde
 Biff Hooper, friend of the Hardy Boys in the novel series The Hardy Boys
 Biff Loman, son of Willy Loman in Arthur Miller's Death of a Salesman
 Biff McIntosh, love interest for Quinn Fabray in the TV series Glee
 Biff Robinson, a character in the book series The Magic Key by Roderick Hunt and Alex Brychta.
 Biff Tannen, in the Back to the Future film trilogy
 Biff Wilcox, in the S. E. Hinton novel Rumble Fish
 "Biff", a nickname of George Costanza in the TV series Seinfeld, named after Loman
 "Biff", nickname of Levi, Jesus' best friend in Lamb: The Gospel According to Biff, Christ's Childhood Pal
 "Biff", nickname of Major General Gordon Cresswell, Judge Advocate General of the United States Navy on the fictional television series JAG
 Sully and Biff, from Sesame Street

Animals
 Biff, the Michigan Wolverine, a mascot for Michigan Wolverines football in the 1920s and 1930s

See also 

 
 

Lists of people by nickname

Masculine given names